Cho Jae-Min (born 22 May 1978) is a South Korean footballer.

Honours

Club 
 Suwon Samsung Bluewings
 K-League (3): 1998, 1999, 2004
 K-League Cup (5): 1999, 1999S, 2000, 2001, 2005
 Korean FA Cup (1): 2002
 Korean Super Cup (3): 1999, 2000, 2005
 AFC Champions League (2): 2000–01, 2001–02
 Asian Super Cup (2): 2001, 2002
 A3 Champions Cup (1): 2005

References

External links 
 

1978 births
Living people
Association football midfielders
South Korean footballers
Suwon Samsung Bluewings players
Daejeon Hana Citizen FC players
K League 1 players